{{Infobox character
| multiple    = yes
| name        = Clone trooper
| series      = Star Wars
| image       = SDCC 2012 - Clone Troopers (7567335018).jpg
| caption     = 104th Battalion Clone Troopers cosplay at San Diego Comic-Con 2012
| first       = Attack of the Clones (2002)
| last        =
| creator     = George Lucas
| portrayer   = {{Plainlist|
 Daniel Logan (Episode II, young)
 Temuera Morrison (Episode II–III, Obi-Wan Kenobi)
 Bodie Taylor (Episode II–III, young adult)
}}
| voice       = 
| species     = Human (cloned)
| gender      = Male
| occupation  = Soldiers
| affiliation = 
}}
Clone troopers are fictional characters in the Star Wars franchise created by George Lucas. They have been featured in a number of Star Wars media, including the live-action films Episode II: Attack of the Clones (2002) and Episode III: Revenge of the Sith (2005), the animated film Star Wars: The Clone Wars (2008) and its follow-up television series of the same name (2008–2014; 2020), the Star Wars Rebels animated series (2014–2018), and the Star Wars: The Bad Batch animated series (2021-), as well as various comics, novels, and video games set in both the Star Wars Legends expanded universe and the current canon. 

Within the Star Wars franchise mythology, clone troopers are artificially produced soldiers. The clone troopers were created at special cloning facilities on the planet Kamino from the DNA of bounty hunter Jango Fett to serve as the military of the Galactic Republic during the Clone Wars, which takes its name from the troopers. All clones are genetically engineered to age at twice the rate of a normal human in order to be ready for deployment much quicker, and be loyal to the higher chain of command. During the Clone Wars, they served under the command of the Jedi Order and fought against the droid armies of the Confederacy of Independent Systems (CIS), a movement organized by numerous planets that sought to secede from the Republic. At the end of the war, Palpatine, the Supreme Chancellor (ruler) of the Republic and secretly a Sith Lord who used the conflict to gain political power, issued Order 66, which branded the Jedi as traitors and caused the clone troopers, under the influence of an inhibitor chip implanted in their brains, to execute them. Following the formation of the Galactic Empire, clone troopers became more and more uncommon as they were slowly replaced by Imperial stormtroopers. One notable legion that remained composed entirely of clones was the 501st Legion, which served directly under Darth Vader.

During the development of The Empire Strikes Back, Lucas initially conceived a planet of clones, which is why the Clone Wars was mentioned for the first time in the original Star Wars (1977) film. The clone trooper armor was designed to suggest an evolution into the stormtroopers of the original trilogy, and it incorporated features from both the armor of stormtroopers and Boba Fett, revealed in Attack of the Clones to be an unaltered clone of Jango. The armored troopers in Attack of the Clones and Revenge of the Sith are computer-generated images voiced by Temuera Morrison, who played Jango. Younger clones were played by Bodie Taylor and Daniel Logan, who played the younger Boba. Clones not wearing helmets were played by both Morrison and Taylor, who wore bodysuits to isolate their heads, and some clone troopers featured a blend of the actors' features. In The Clone Wars film and all animated television series, adult clone troopers are voiced by Dee Bradley Baker and child clone troopers are voiced by Logan. In Star Wars: Clone Wars (2003-2005), all clones were voiced by Andrè Sogiluzzo.

While the prequel trilogy depicted clone troopers as soldiers lacking any personality, The Clone Wars introduced numerous clones with distinctive traits, who quickly became fan favorites. The television series in particular humanized the clones, exploring their motivations and feelings about the Clone Wars. Since then, numerous Star Wars works set during the Clone Wars era have featured clone troopers as main characters. Clone troopers have become cultural icons, and a widely recognized element of the Star Wars franchise.

 Concept and creation 
 Development and design 

In writing The Empire Strikes Back, Leigh Brackett's first draft of the film initially developed Lando Calrissian as a clone from a planet of clones involved in the Clone Wars mentioned in A New Hope and were nearly made extinct by the war, but this concept was not featured in the final film. George Lucas later came up with the alternate concept of an army of clone shock troops from a remote planet used by the Republic in the war that followed. Lucas intended for the prequel trilogy to depict the evolution of the galaxy's fighting forces, and the clone troopers were the step after flawed battle droids.

Clone troopers were designed to strongly suggest the army's evolution into the Empire's stormtrooper army. Concept artist Jay Shuster said of the armor design, "It follows the formula for a lot of the prequel trilogy. Take something pre-conceived in the existing trilogy and de-generate it." Design Director Doug Chiang incorporated both features of the Boba Fett and stormtrooper armor into the design, acknowledging the "vague assertion in Star Wars lore" that Fett's armor was connected to those of the stormtroopers. Initial concept models implied that the first generation armor was thicker and bulkier than stormtrooper armor, and this characteristic was retained by the art department for Revenge of the Sith. Lucas expressed a desire for individualized trooper armor from the beginning of art development for Revenge of the Sith. Several variations were largely dictated by environmental needs, but others were influenced of the 2003 Clone Wars animated series and the desert stormtroopers of A New Hope. The clone trooper designs "progressed" closer toward the stormtrooper designs, and the film included variant designs similar to the sandtrooper, scout trooper, and snowtrooper armor of the original trilogy.

The designs of clone trooper in snow and cold weather gear, seen in season one of The Clone Wars, are heavily inspired by early concept and costume by Ralph McQuarrie, Joe Johnston, and John Mollo for The Empire Strikes Back.

 Portrayal 
In Attack of the Clones and Revenge of the Sith, all clone troopers are computer-generated images and are voiced by Temuera Morrison, who played the clone template Jango Fett. The child clone troopers were played by Daniel Logan, who also played Jango's clone son Boba Fett, and the clone troopers as young men were played by Bodie Taylor, who was cast for his resemblance to a younger Morrison. Taylor was filmed multiple times and composited to fill out crowded shots set in Tipoca City, and in some cases, such as for distant shots, he was entirely digital.

Commander Cody, seen in armor without his helmet in Revenge of the Sith, was played by Morrison. He wore a blue bodysuit and only footage of his head was used for Cody; he held a stormtrooper helmet to approximate the digital clone trooper helmet Cody carries. Like Morrison, Taylor also played armored and  clones with out helmets in Revenge of the Sith, wearing a blue bodysuit that isolated his head. Some clone troopers were entirely digital and featured a digital blend of Morrison's and Taylor's facial features. The armor was match-animated to the actors' bodies.

The clone troopers are voiced by Dee Bradley Baker in the 2008 animated film The Clone Wars and its related animated television series of the same name. Baker attempted to give each clone trooper a unique voice, taking into account personality, age, and position within the unit, sometimes describing the clone in a single adjective and focusing on that descriptor for the voice work. Each clone was voiced individually, with all the clone's lines for the episode recorded at one time before moving to another character, and the dialogue was edited together.

Logan voiced the young clone troopers in seasons two and three of the 2008 television series. Baker reprises his role in the 2014 Rebels and 2021 The Bad Batch animated series'.

 Appearances 
 Film 

In Attack of the Clones (2002), Jedi Master Obi-Wan Kenobi discovers the clone army on Kamino. He is told by the Kaminoans that Jedi Master Sifo-Dyas ordered the army on the Republic's behalf ten years prior; however, Sifo-Dyas' apparent death shortly before that timeframe leads the Jedi Order to doubt this. The clone troopers are cloned from Jango Fett, a bounty hunter hired by a man named Tyranus, later revealed to be Sith Lord Count Dooku. The clone troopers' genetics are altered so that they age at twice the normal rate and are more loyal and easier to command. The clone army is deployed to Geonosis under the command of the Jedi to rescue Obi-Wan, Anakin Skywalker, and Padmé Amidala from execution by the Separatists. The ensuing battle becomes the first one in the Clone Wars. Although the clone army emerges victorious, Dooku and many other Separatist leaders escape, meaning that the war has only just begun.

In Revenge of the Sith (2005), set three years later, the clone army continues to fight in the Clone Wars against the Separatist battle droid army. However, just as it appears that the Republic will win the war, Chancellor Palpatine, secretly the Sith Lord Darth Sidious, orders the clone army to execute Order 66, turning them against the Jedi. The clone troopers kill their Jedi commanders, although a few manage to escape, while the 501st Legion, led by the newly christened Darth Vader, storms the Jedi Temple, burning it and killing the Jedi inside, which effectively ends the Jedi Order. Following Vader's assassination of the remaining Separatist leaders, Palpatine transforms the Republic into the Galactic Empire and the clone army becomes the basis of the Imperial Army.

Clone troopers are referenced in The Force Awakens (2015) when Kylo Ren chides General Hux for the betrayal of rogue stormtrooper FN-2187 and suggests that Supreme Leader Snoke should consider a clone army.

 Animation 
The Clone Wars
Clone troopers are heavily featured in the 2008 animated film The Clone Wars, which spawned an animated series of the same name that lasted until 2014, with a final season released in 2020. Many named clone troopers are introduced and given individual personalities, serving as the focus of several story arcs. In the 6th season, more of the nature of "Order 66" is revealed when a clone trooper named Fives discovers that he and his brothers have chips implanted into their brains that would compel them to kill Jedi when "Order 66" is uttered. Ultimately, the Jedi remained unaware of this as Fives was executed by a shock trooper clone ordered by Palpatine to conceal the existence of the contingency order.

 Rebels 
The 2014 animated TV show Star Wars Rebels features a group of former clone troopers, including Rex from the preceding cartoon, who had their chips removed and therefore did not carry out Order 66. They are first introduced in the second season, about 16 years after Revenge of the Sith. These clones help the crew of the Ghost in their fight against the Empire, and eventually join the Rebel Alliance. Rebels established that in the years after the Clone Wars, the Empire gradually replaced the aging clones with the less-effective but more numerous stormtroopers. The clones were not purged, but simply cast aside over time, and without familial or social networks to fall back onto it was difficult for them to integrate into civilian life. In a behind the scenes Q&A for episode 2.2, when asked what happened to the Clone Troopers after the war ended, producer Pablo Hidalgo explained: "A lot of different things happened to them. Some of them had pretty sad situations. In many ways the Clone Troopers are sort of this 'lost generation' of unappreciated veterans who helped save the galaxy and were then discarded." He went on to explain that a small handful of Clone Troopers were kept in service as instructors at imperial academies across the galaxy, training up the next generation of non-clone soldiers as the new Stormtroopers.

 The Bad Batch 
The 2021 animated series Star Wars: The Bad Batch focuses on the eponymous team called Clone Force 99, a squad of clone commandos with deliberately modified genetic traits granting them mildly superhuman abilities. The first season begins during Order 66 and its aftermath, as the Republic transitions into the Empire. Most of them are explained to have ignored Order 66 because the extensive alterations to their DNA structures prevented the inhibitor chips, which compelled the other clones to carry out the directive, from functioning properly. The only exception for this is Crosshair, who is eventually reprogrammed by Admiral Tarkin to make him totally loyal to the new Empire and thus the Bad Batch's enemy. The Bad Batch also ends up taking in a young female clone named Omega, who is, like them, a genetical deviant and therefore feels a kinship with them. In the first season, Admiral Tarkin directly explains the switchover from Clone Troopers to Stormtroopers, citing that a recruitment-based army of non-clones costs half as much as the clones: while recruits are not as well trained, there is a vast supply of them, and they are meant more for pacification duty than wartime combat.

 In other media 
In the 2022 live-action TV series Obi-Wan Kenobi, during the first season Obi-Wan (played by Ewan McGregor reprising his role) is walking through a city on the planet Daiyu, where he encounters a former Clone Trooper (again played by Temuera Morrison), now a disheveled homeless veteran begging on the streets. This is in keeping with Hidalgo's explanation during Rebels of what happened to most Clone Troopers after the war ended.

In the novels Lords of the Sith by Paul S. Kemp, and Tarkin by James Luceno, several clone troopers are still in active service during the early years of the Empire's reign, such as among stormtroopers serving Darth Vader, and even among the Emperor's elite Imperial Guard.

In the Legends game Star Wars Battlefront II, the only clone troopers were fitted with new armour and weapons, and became the Imperial Deathtroopers, Purge Troopers and Royal Elite Guards of the Empire. Later, a combination of natural-born humans as well as clones from different donor templates would be incorporated into the Stormtrooper corps.

 Individual clone troopers 
 Coruscant Guard 
The Coruscant Guard is a division of the Grand Army of the Republic tasked with internal security and peacekeeping operations on Coruscant, protecting "soft target" public spaces and important "hard target" buildings, and serving as escorts and guards on diplomatic missions. They first appear in Episode III: Revenge of the Sith, where they search for Yoda's body in the Senate building after his duel with Darth Sidious and later help Sidious recover Darth Vader's body on Mustafar. The Coruscant Guard appears in The Clone Wars film and television series, led by Commander Fox. They hunt Jedi fugitive Ahsoka Tano when she is framed for the bombing of the Jedi Temple and for murder in season five, and they search for ARC trooper Fives when he is framed for an assassination attempt on Supreme Chancellor Palpatine in season six. In season seven, a skirmish broke out onboard former Jedi Padawan Ahsoka Tano's Venator-class Star Destroyer during the final days of the Clone Wars when clone troopers of the 332nd Company and Coruscant Guard received Order 66 from Supreme Chancellor Sheev Palpatine. Members of the Coruscant Guard wear armor with red markings, and are often referred to as shock troopers.

 Commander Fox 
Marshal Commander Fox, CC-1010, led the Coruscant Guard, an elite clone trooper unit assigned to serve as peace-keepers on the Galactic Republic capital. Following the Battle on Teth, Fox's squad rescued Senator Padmé Amidala from Ziro the Hutt. Fox stormed Ziro's Palace, took out his battle droids, and freed Amidala. Ziro was taken to the Republic Judiciary Central Detention Center. When Cad Bane entered the Senate building and held a number of Senators and the Supreme Chancellor hostage, Fox led a company of the Coruscant Guard to cut off his escape. Unfortunately, Bane had rigged the chamber and the hostages with explosives. Seeing this, Fox ordered his men to stand down and allowed the bounty hunter and his team to leave the Senate building.

Like every other clone trooper in the Guard, Fox was bound by honor and duty to protect and serve the Supreme Chancellor and the members of the Galactic Senate. Utterly fearless, he was always the first to lead the charge into battle, even in the most perilous combat situations. His unquestionable loyalty meant he would carry out his orders without question, even if it meant killing a Jedi or another "brother". His exemplary performance has made him one of the most highly decorated soldiers in the Republic army. Additional sources state that Fox continued his duty on Coruscant, until an error on his part led Darth Vader to execute him by force snapping his neck.

 Commander Thire 
Commander Thire, CC-4477, is a Coruscant Guard clone shock trooper who served as a lieutenant in the Coruscant Guard of the Grand Army of the Republic. During the Clone Wars, he accompanied Grand Master Yoda of the Jedi Order on a diplomatic assignment to meet with King Katuunko of Toydaria. In the course of their mission Yoda inspired his clone troopers to take strength from their individual traits, such as Thire's patience.

Following the initiation of Order 66 and the subsequent confrontation between Yoda and Emperor Palpatine in 19 BBY, Thire and his troopers were ordered to hunt the Jedi Master. The failure to locate his body convinced Mas Amedda that Yoda was still alive, leading the Emperor to order Thire to resume the search. However, Yoda succeeded in escaping from Coruscant with the aid of Senator Bail Organa. Thire later accompanied Palpatine to Mustafar to recover the critically wounded Darth Vader.

 501st Legion 

The 501st Legion is a division of the Grand Army of the Republic—in both canon and Legends—under the command of Jedi General Anakin Skywalker and Padawan Commander Ahsoka Tano. The 501st fought against the droid forces of the Confederacy of Independent Systems (CIS) throughout the Clone Wars. 

The 501st first appears unnamed in Revenge of the Sith under the leadership of Clone Marshal Commander Appo, and they assault the Jedi Temple on Coruscant under Order 66. The 501st Legion also appears extensively throughout Star Wars Battlefront video game franchise and The Clone Wars television series, under the leadership of Captain Rex of Torrent Company. In the Star Wars Legends expanded universe, after the conversion of the Republic into the Galactic Empire, the 501st Legion (nicknamed "Vader's Fist") is placed under the command of General Maximilian Veers that serves as Darth Vader's personal battalion. In current Canon media, the 501st still remain under the command of Vader, however a new group named the First Legion is established as his personal task force, which recruits only from 501st ranks. Members of the 501st Legion wear armor with blue markings. The unit is named after the 501st Legion costuming group.

Notable sub-divisions within the 501st Legion include:
332nd Company, which was active during the Clone Wars after former Jedi Padawan Ahsoka Tano left the Jedi Order. When she returned to help Republic forces stage an invasion of Mandalore, the company—alongside Clone Commander CT-7567 "Rex", ARC Lieutenant CT-5597 "Jesse", and Clone Captain CT-0292 "Vaughn"— was assigned to aid her. The troopers painted their helmets orange, in Ahsoka's likeness. After Order 66 was issued, the 332nd's Venator crash landed on the surface of an unnamed moon, killing all except Ahsoka, Rex, and Maul, who managed to escape. Before leaving, Ahsoka and Rex dug graves for the fallen soldiers as a memorial to them.
Torrent Company, an elite military unit led by Clone Captain CT-7567 "Rex", who served as second-in-command to Jedi General Anakin Skywalker. The company is distinguished for their engagements against the Confederacy of Independent Systems throughout the war, including the Battle of Christophsis, the Battle of Teth, and the Battle of Horain. Torrent Company died along with the 332nd soon after Order 66.

During Star Wars Celebration 2016, Dave Filoni stated that in a planned story arc for The Clone Wars, Ahsoka, who has left the Jedi Order, is given (honorary) command of part of the 501st Legion, 332nd Company, including Captain Rex; those under her command repaint their helmets orange and adorn them with Ahsoka's togruta (lekku) markings. She leads them at the siege of Mandalore, which takes place at the same time as the beginning of Revenge of the Sith (19BBY). It would later be a part of the new Season 7 episodes on Disney+.

 Commander Appo 
Marshal Commander Appo, CC-1119, served in the 501st Legion under the command of Jedi General Anakin Skywalker. He first appears in Episode III: Revenge of the Sith, in which he and other members of the 501st carry out Order 66 and follow Anakin, now Darth Vader, in attacking the Jedi Temple on Coruscant. He stops Senator Bail Organa from entering the Temple. Appo later appears in season four of The Clone Wars television series as a sergeant in the 501st serving under clone Captain Rex. His armor bears blue markings. In The Clone Wars television series, his helmet is adorned with a white arrow in reference to Appa of the Avatar: The Last Airbender television series, on which The Clone Wars supervising director Dave Filoni worked.

 Commander Rex 

Commander Rex, CT-7567, leads Torrent Company of the 501st Legion, often under the command of Jedi General Anakin Skywalker and Jedi Commander Ahsoka Tano. He first appears with the rank of Captain in The Clone Wars film and its related television series, and he is the primary recurring clone trooper protagonist of the series. In the seventh season of the series (which overlaps with Revenge of the Sith), Rex is promoted to Commander and leads part of the 501st Legion, called the 332nd legion (Ahsoka Troopers) in the Siege of Mandalore alongside Ahsoka. When Order 66 is issued, he attempts to execute Ahsoka, but she removes his chip and restores his free will, before the pair part ways. Rex later appears in the Rebels television series, set fourteen years after Revenge of the Sith. Now a much older man because of his accelerated aging, he lives on the wasteland planet Seelos and hunted worm-like joopa with fellow clones Wolffe and Gregor before they are offered a place in the Rebel Alliance, which leads to Rex reuniting with Ahsoka. In the series' epilogue, it is mentioned that Rex fought in several battles throughout the Galactic Civil War, most notably the battle of Endor.

 ARC Trooper Fives 
ARC Trooper Fives, CT-27-5555, serves alongside fellow ARC Trooper Echo. He first appears in The Clone Wars season one episode "Rookies" as a regular trooper. He and his unit are assigned to a remote listening outpost that is invaded by Separatist droids. Though the invasion is successfully repelled, only Fives and Echo survive, and they are reassigned to the 501st Legion. The season three episode "Clone Cadets" depicts Fives and his unit as cadets in training on Kamino. The unit, called Domino squad, consists also of cadets Cutup, Droidbait, and Hevy. They are initially unable to work together to pass their final test. Fives and Echo feel weighed down by the others in the squad and ask to be reassigned, but the request is denied. Under the advice of Jedi General Shaak Ti, Fives and Echo recommit themselves to Domino, and the squad is able to pass. Fives and Echo are eventually promoted to ARC troopers together for their actions while defending Kamino and continue serving with the 501st. When assigned to the command of Jedi General Pong Krell during the campaign on Umbara, Fives finds Krell's disregard for clone trooper lives appalling and openly disagrees with Krell and with Captain Rex, who is insistent on following orders. After discovering how to pilot Umbaran fighters, Fives, along with fellow clones Jesse and Hardcase disobey direct orders and destroy Umbaran supply ships delivering arms to the Umbaran Capital using the starfighters, with Hardcase sacrificing himself in the process. Though their actions allow a Republic victory, Krell, without process of a court-martial, finds Fives and Jesse guilty of treason and sentences them to execution by firing squad. However, Fives urges his fellow troopers to see this as an injustice, and the firing squad refuses to execute him. After Krell is ousted as a Republic Traitor, Fives is freed from custody and aids Rex and the 501st in arresting Krell, with clone trooper Dogma eventually using Fives’ blaster to execute Krell.

In season six, during a battle over Ringo Vinda, Fives and the 501st are winning the battle until fellow clone Tup mysteriously executes Jedi General Tiplar, forcing the 501st to retreat. After rescuing Tup from Separatists and delivering him to Kamino for a medical investigation, Fives discovers a mysterious tumour in Tup's head before the latter dies. After realising the Kaminoans intend to wipe his mind, Fives launches his own investigation and realises the “tumour” in Tup's head is an inhibitor chip implanted in every clone from a young stage. Jedi Master Shaak Ti brings him to inform Palpatine about the chips, where Palpatine, being the true mastermind behind the conspiracy, reveals the chips’ true purpose to Fives. He frames Fives for an assassination attempt, initiating a manhunt for Fives. With the help of 501st medic Kix, Fives is able to contact Rex and Anakin Skywalker, and he attempts to warn them of the conspiracy and of Palpatine's involvement. He is ultimately killed by Commander Fox of the Coruscant Guard and dies in Rex's arms.

Fives' name is derived from his designation number (CT-27-5555), which features fives in sequence. He is distinguished by a goatee and a stylized numeral five tattoo on his right temple. His armor bears blue markings, and a stylized worm creature adorns his helmets; after his promotion to ARC trooper, he also wears light gray pauldrons on his shoulders and kilt-like kama painted with blue stripes. He regards duty and honor above orders and protocol, feeling that there is no honor in following foolish orders and marching to his death. He insists that clone troopers be referred to by name, not number, and that they are soldiers, not units, and should be treated as such. He is a close friend of Rex and, after the apparent death of Echo, considers his best friend to be fellow trooper Tup, who aids Fives against Krell and is one of the first to refuse executing Fives when given the order by Krell. When Tup begins behaving abnormally due to his inhibitor chip malfunctioning, Fives goes to great lengths and disregards order to attempt to save Tup's life and, later, discover the true cause of Tup's death. With his dying words, he describes attempting to expose the conspiracy to have been his duty.

 Corporal Echo 

Corporal Echo, CT-21-0408, sometimes CT-1409, serves alongside fellow ARC trooper Fives. He first appears in The Clone Wars season one episode "Rookies" as a regular trooper. He and his unit are assigned to a remote listening outpost that is invaded by Separatist droids. Though the invasion is successfully repelled, only Echo and Fives survive, and they are reassigned to the 501st Legion. The season three episode "Clone Cadets" depicts Echo and his unit as cadets in training on Kamino. The unit, called Domino squad, is initially unable to work together to pass their final test. Echo and Fives feel weighed down by the others in the squad and ask to be reassigned, but the request is denied. Under the advice of Jedi General Shaak Ti, Echo and Fives recommit themselves to Domino, and the squad is able to pass. Echo and Fives are eventually promoted to ARC troopers together for their actions while defending Kamino and continue serving with the 501st. Echo is apparently killed in an explosion during a rescue operation in the season three episode "Counter Attack".

Story reels for a previously unfinished four-episode arc called "Bad Batch" (initially part of The Clone Wars Legacy project, the episodes were later released on Disney+ in their completed state) revealed that Echo survived and was captured by the Separatists. He was modified into a cyborg able to communicate directly to computers and tasked with decoding the Republic strategy algorithm. Echo is rescued by Captain Rex, and with his ability to understand Separatist transmissions, he plays a key role in the Battle of Anaxes, earning a victory against the Separatists. After the mission, Echo decided to join Clone Force 99 as Hunter's second in command. He remained with them beyond the formation of the Galactic Empire, and was present for Clone Force 99's desertion from the Empire and subsequent run from his former squadmate, Crosshair. Echo would eventually survive the destruction of Tipoca City, capital of Kamino.

Echo's armor bears blue markings, and a blue handprint adorns his chest-plate, created when Rex touched it while covered in eel blood during Echo's first mission. After his promotion to ARC trooper, Echo also wears light gray pauldrons on his shoulders and a kilt-like kama painted in an asymmetrical white and blue design. Later, after his rescue from Separatist capture, he is visibly a cyborg, with various apparatus protruding from his head and a droid plug in place of his right hand; post-rescue, he takes to wearing what appears to be a stripped-down variant on Standard Phase II Armor. Throughout his appearances, he is characterized as one who strictly follows orders, regulations, and protocol. Echo's name is given to him by Domino squad on Kamino as a sarcastic reference to his tendency to immediately repeat orders, even if his squad already heard.

 Lieutenant Jesse 
Lieutenant Jesse, CT-5597, is a member in the 501st Legion. In season four's Battle of Umbara, Jesse, like Fives comes to consider General Pong Krell to be ruthless and reckless (mainly over the casualty numbers). He later helps Fives and Hardcase on a rogue mission to destroy a Separatist supply ship, which succeeds at the cost of Hardcase's life. In season seven, he takes part in the Siege of Mandalore, during which he is captured and interrogated by Maul, and later attempts to execute Ahsoka Tano when Order 66 is issued. After Commander Rex has his chip removed and sides with Ahsoka, Jesse accuses him of treason and tries to kill him as well, but dies along with all the troopers aboard when the Venator-class Star Destroyer they are on crashes on a small moon, and is buried by Ahsoka and Rex.

Jesse is distinguished by his shaved hair with the Republic symbol tattooed on most of his head. His armor bears blue markings with the Republic symbol on the center.

 Trooper Kix 
Trooper Kix, CT-6116, is a medic serving in the 501st Legion. In season six, Kix aids Fives, a fugitive because he discovered the inhibitor chip conspiracy. The short story "The Crimson Corsair and the Lost Treasure of Count Dooku" reveals that this action prompted Count Dooku to capture Kix, who discovered the conspiracy himself by the time of his capture. With droids failing to secure a confession, Kix was frozen in stasis for delivery to Dooku. The ship crashed into a planet during a randomized hyperspace jump to escape a Republic attack and protect "Dooku's prize". Fifty years later, Kix is released from stasis by pirates searching for "the lost treasure of Count Dooku". Kix is taken aboard the Corsair's ship and welcomed to their endeavor of raiding forgotten Separatist bases.

Kix is distinguished by his shaved hair and a phrase translating to "a good droid is a dead one" tattooed across his head. His armor bears blue markings, and his Phase II armor bears a red insignia marking him as a medic. He is "dedicated to preserving the life of his brothers", and he even tells an injured Captain Rex, "As the team medic, when it comes to the health of the men, including you, I outrank everyone." However, he still has "no qualms about fighting the enemy".

 Trooper Tup 
Trooper Tup, CT-5385, was part of the 501st legion under Captain Rex. He served in the Umbara campaign and was key to the capture of treasonous Jedi General Pong Krell, supporting and siding with his friend Fives even after Fives had been condemned to death by Krell and stunning the Jedi after a fierce battle with mutinous 501st clones led by Rex. In the sixth season, Tup suffered a malfunction in a biotechnical chip implanted in his brain shortly after his creation by the Kaminoans. Intended to ensure that the clones obeyed Order 66, the chip caused Tup to shoot and kill Jedi General Tiplar despite not having been ordered to. As Tup was being shipped back to Kamino for evaluation, he was kidnapped by the Separatists (who wanted to know why his chip had malfunctioned), only to be recovered shortly afterwards. Tup's actions led to the discovery of the chips by both the Jedi and the clones themselves, but Tup died of medical complications soon afterwards. Though Fives attempted to avenge Tup's death by finding the truth behind the chips, he was killed by Commander Fox, before he could reveal what he had learned; Tup's actions and death were officially declared the results of a locally acquired virus.

Tup's armor featured the blue markings common in the 501st, as well as an image of a single blue teardrop underneath the right eye of his helmet; this matched a tattoo on his face.

 212th Attack Battalion 

The 212th Attack Battalion is a division of the Grand Army of the Republic under the command of Jedi General Obi-Wan Kenobi and his subordinate, Clone Marshal Commander Cody. The 212th fought against the droid forces of the Confederacy of Independent Systems throughout the Clone Wars. A component of the 7th Sky Corps of the Third Systems Army, it consisted of both standard clone infantry and clone paratroopers. The battalion fought on a multitude of worlds throughout the Clone Wars, including early campaigns on Christophsis, Teth, Ryloth, Saleucami and Geonosis, to latter battles on Kiros, Sarrish, Moorjhone and Umbara. The 212th was also involved in numerous special operations missions; which included an infiltration mission on Lola Sayu.

By the third and last year of the conflict, the 212th led an invasion of the Separatist-controlled worlds, including Anaxes and Utapau. During the latter battle, Kenobi killed General Grievous, marking a major loss for the Separatists and bringing the Republic one step closer to winning the war. However, Kenobi was ultimately betrayed by his soldiers upon the activation of Order 66, a protocol that called for the extermination of all Jedi. The clones failed to execute their former leader, however. Following the proclamation of the New Order, the 212th was folded into the armed forces of the Galactic Empire. During their days in service to the new government, with General Kahdah as the commanding officer, the battalion was dispatched to the Wookiee homeworld of Kashyyyk where they suppressed an indigenous uprising.

Notable sub-divisions within the 212th Attack Battalion include:
Ghost Company - participated in several battles and campaigns. Most Ghost Company clone troopers bore orange markings on their standard clone trooper armor. Many also had customized helmet coloration designs.
Foxtrot Group - an elite commando unit, led by Clone Captain Gregor, within the Special Operations Brigade of the Grand Army of the Republic. It was attached in direct support to the 212th Attack Battalion and was deployed during the Battle of Sarrish, though many of its troopers perished in that battle.

 Marshal Commander Cody 

Marshal Commander Cody, CC-2224, leads the 212th Attack Battalion under the command of Jedi General Obi-Wan Kenobi. He first appears in Episode III: Revenge of the Sith during the Battle of Utapau, aiding Obi-Wan against General Grievous on the planet Utapau. He is the first clone trooper to receive Order 66 on-screen, and he obediently commands his troopers to shoot down Obi-Wan and to locate his body to confirm the kill. Cody later appears in The Clone Wars film and its related television series, as well as in season 2 of Star Wars: The Bad Batch.

Cody is distinguished by a scar on the left side of his face. His armor bears orange markings, and he wears visors on his helmets. He is characterized as a cautious but "natural and practical leader" whose "keen ability to strategize, combined with his fierce combat style in the heat of battle, earned him the respect of the Jedi, and of his fellow clones". He is also noted to adhere to standard procedures and protocol. Cody is particularly loyal to Obi-Wan, whom he complemented well, and their relationship is characterized by a mutual camaraderie and trust, though this did not prevent Cody from attempting to kill Kenobi as part of Order 66. Cody is also friends with Captain Rex, having completed many missions together.

 Captain Gregor 
Captain Gregor, CC-5576-39, is the former leader of Foxtrot Group, an elite commando unit within the Special Operations Brigade of the Grand Army of the Republic, attached in direct support to the 212th Attack Battalion. He is introduced in the season five episode "Missing in Action"—suffering amnesia and living on the distant planet Abafar, where a stranded D-Squad—a Republic covert-ops unit consisting of droids looking for a Separatist decoding chip—discovers him working as a dishwasher in a diner. It is revealed that he lost his memories and sense of identity after a shuttle crash during the devastating Battle of Sarrish. He was rescued by his employer, who keeps Gregor's true identity from him to prevent him from leaving, but Gregor is able to regain his sense of duty and his armor to help the Republic. Gregor holds off Separatist droids to allow the Republic mission to escape, and despite his promise to make his way home, he is seemingly killed in an explosion of rhydonium. He later appears in the Rebels television series, set fourteen years after Revenge of the Sith. He is revealed to have removed his inhibitor chip, preventing him from carrying out Order 66. Now a much older man because of his accelerated aging, he lives on the wasteland planet Seelos and hunts worm-like joopa with Captain Rex (CT-7567) and Commander Wolffe (CT-3636). Sometime after the Clone Wars, he suffered a brain injury, causing him to suffer brief periods of apparent insanity.  When the Spectres, a team of rebels from the planet Lothal, arrive on Seelos to ask for help, Gregor initially declines, but eventually assists them in fending off an Imperial attack after Wolffe inadvertently exposes them to the Empire. He later took part in a final battle to free Lothal from Imperial control, where he was fatally wounded by an Imperial technician.

Gregor's commando armor bears yellow markings and an off-white camouflage pattern, and his helmet is adorned with hash-marks modeled after those on Gerry Cheevers' hockey mask.

91st Mobile Reconnaissance Corps
The 91st Mobile Reconnaissance Corps is a division of the Grand Army of the Republic. Though officially led by Jedi General Adi Gallia and his subordinate, Clone Marshal Commander Neyo, other Jedi Generals such as Mace Windu, Oppo Rancisis and Stass Allie led the 91st during key missions. As a deep reconnaissance-expeditionary division, it was their job to scout ahead and send back critical info to GAR leadership before a large deployment. As a corps, it was made up of roughly 37,000  clone troopers, BARC troopers, and ARF troopers,  organised into 16 regiments. The 91st was easily distinguishable by the red colour on their armour, as well as their signature crest, which was a small red circle with a white sword pointing upside down through it. The 91st led the assault in the Battle of Ryloth and the Siege of Saleucami.

Notable sub-divisions within the 212th Attack Battalion include:
Lightning Squadron - a military cavalry squadron in the Grand Army of the Republic, composed of Advanced Recon Force clone troopers. During the Clone Wars, Lightning Squadron served under the leadership of Clone Commander CT-411 "Ponds," who reported directly to Jedi General Mace Windu. In 22 BBY the squadron deployed to Ryloth as part of a military campaign to liberate the Twi'lek homeworld from Separatist occupation.

 Marshal Commander Neyo 
Marshal Commander Neyo, CC-8826, leads the 91st Mobile Reconnaissance Corps, with initial-command given to Jedi General Mace Windu in the Battle of Ryloth and Battle of Anaxes; command was later transferred to Jedi Generals Adi Gallia and Stass Allie. Aside from BARC speeders, the corps utilized AT-AP walkers, and AT-RT walkers. The elite cavalry unit Lightning Squadron was part of the 91st Reconnaissance Corps. As the war with the Confederacy of Independent Systems progressed, in 20 BBY, the Republic Military formed a special covert-ops team of droids known as D-Squad which consisted of four astromech droids, R2-D2, QT-KT, U9-C4, M5-BZ, and Neyo's DUM-series pit droid, designated WAC-47, and was placed under the command of Colonel Meebur Gascon. D-Squad's primary objective was to infiltrate a Separatist Providence-class carrier/destroyer and steal an encryption module that was housed aboard, which was successful. Later, the commander attended a Republic strategy conference at the Valor space station located in the Carida system. During the conference, a Separatist attack on the station was thwarted by the members of D-Squad. Neyo and his troops were stationed on the Outer Rim world of Saleucami, under the command of Jedi General Stass Allie, in the waning days of the Clone Wars. While patrolling the planet's surface, he received a message from Supreme Chancellor Sheev Palpatine instructing him to execute Order 66. Neyo fired his BARC speeder's laser cannons on the general, adding Allie to the list of Jedi who perished. After the transformation of the Galactic Republic into the Galactic Empire, 91st Recon Corps was folded into the Imperial Army. Neyo had a specialized helmet similar to that of Commander Wolffe, and sported a sash on his armor, and a small, grey, shoulder pauldron over his right shoulder as well.

 Commander Ponds 
Commander Ponds, CT-411, leads the Advanced Recon Force Lightning Squadron of the GAR 91st Mobile Reconnaissance Corps. During the Battle of Geonosis, Commander Ponds arranged for five special commando units to follow Windu's orders during the first battle of the war.

104th Battalion
The 104th "Wolf Pack" Battalion is a division of the Grand Army of the Republic, led by Jedi General Plo Koon and his subordinate, Clone Marshal Commander Wolffe, during the Clone Wars between the Galactic Republic and the Confederacy of Independent Systems.
Notable sub-divisions within the 212th Attack Battalion include:
Wolfpack Squad - the infamous Wolf Pack appeared in 12 episodes of the Clone Wars animated series. The Wolfpack was a clone trooper squad in the 104th Battalion of the Grand Army of the Republic. Members included Clone Sergeant "Sinker," Clone Corporal "Comet," and CT-4860 "Boost."

 Commander Wolffe 

Marshal Commander Wolffe, CC-3636, leads the 104th Battalion under the command of Jedi General Plo Koon. Under "relationships" section, click second image labeled "Clone Commander Wolffe". He is introduced in The Clone Wars season one episode "Rising Malevolence". He is the first officer aboard Plo's flagship Triumphant when it is destroyed by General Grievous and is one of three clones to survive. Afterward, he appears with a redesigned character model, including a cybernetic eye implant caused by a fight with Separatist assassin Ventress, and leads a tight-knit unit nicknamed Wolfpack on the battlefield. He later appears in the Rebels television series, set fourteen years after Revenge of the Sith. Wolffe is revealed to have removed his inhibitor chip, preventing him from carrying out Order 66. Now a much older man because of his accelerated aging, he lives on the wasteland planet Seelos and hunts worm-like joopa with Rex and Gregor. When they are sought by the rebel protagonists, Wolffe is suspicious of their motives and contacts the Empire to protect himself, Rex, and Gregor. Rex convinces him that the rebels can be trusted, and Wolffe regrets his actions.  He then thwarts an incoming attack from the Empire to save the rebels, and later on helps them free their planet from Imperial occupation once and for all.

Wolffe is distinguished by a scar running through his eye and a silver cybernetic eye implant. His armor is adorned with a gray stylized likeness of a wolf, and he wears a kilt-like kama. He is characterized as detail-oriented and as having "a sense of strategy superior to that of most clone officers, making him a highly effective complement to Plo." He is impatient with missions that send him away from the battlefield and becomes quickly exasperated with garrulous protocol droid C-3PO.

327th Star Corps
The 327th Star Corps is a division of the Grand Army of the Republic, led by Jedi General Aayla Secura and her subordinate, Clone Marshal Commander Bly, during the Clone Wars between the Galactic Republic and the Confederacy of Independent Systems.

The 327th Star Corps was a detachment of the 2nd Sector Army, one of the six Sector Armies based in the Core Worlds. Since its own territory was relatively insulated from Separatist attack, many  of the 2nd Sector Army’s component units were deployed to reinforce the beleaguered Sector Armies fighting in the Outer Rim. The 327th was one such unit, frequently dispatched to hot zones to stem the bleeding. The 327th had an extremely long combat history; it was one of the five full corps that fought on Battle of Geonosis, where it suffered heavy casualties. The 327th component unit Hawkbat Battalion was almost completely wiped out in a clash with a column of Homing Spider Droids. Despite the many casualties sustained at Geonosis, however, the battle ended in a Republic victory, and the 327th Star Corps limped off to the next battlefield.

Secura and Bly made for a great team; Bly’s unwavering focus on the mission contrasted well with Secura’s unorthodox tactics and ingenuity,  allowing the 327th to overcome any situation. By the end of the war, the clones of the 327th were among the most skilled in the Grand Army of the Republic. The unit's veterans were  well known for their expertise at fighting in hostile environments, and many of the  327th’s elite cadre had ARC Trooper training.  Most of the clones within the 327th Star  Corps wore armor with yellow stripes, a trend that appears to have been started  by Commander Bly, who kept his yellow commander’s stripes after the transition  between Phase I and Phase II armor. 

 Marshal Commander Bly 

Marshal Commander Bly, CC-5052, leads the 327th Star Corps under the command of Jedi General Aayla Secura. He first appears in Episode III: Revenge of the Sith, in which he and his men carry out Order 66 and shoot Aayla in the back, killing her. He later appears in season one of The Clone Wars television series alongside Aayla. Bly is distinguished by his close-shaved hair and yellow rectangular tattoos on his cheeks. His armor bears yellow markings, and he wears a brown pauldron on his left shoulder, a kilt-like kama, and binocular attachments on his helmets. He is known as a dependable soldier who greatly values the success of the mission, and he has a "close working relationship" with Aayla and respects her dedication to achieving her objectives.

41st Elite Corps
The 41st Elite Corps is a division of the Grand Army of the Republic, led by Jedi General Luminara Unduli and her subordinate, Clone Marshal Commander Gree, during the Clone Wars between the Galactic Republic and the Confederacy of Independent Systems.

Roughly the size of the division consisting of nine thousand two hundred and sixteen clone troopers, the 41st earned its name being recognized as not only the best division within the ninth assault Corps but also within the entire Third Army; the army intended to be a reserve unit for all mid rim operations. The 41st Elite specialized in missions upon alien planets within hostile and grueling terrain. The Legion would often serve as alien recruitment and counter insurgency against the separatists as a byproduct of their deployment locations.

 Commander Gree 

Marshal Commander Gree, CC-1004, leads the 41st Elite Corps under the command of Jedi General Luminara Unduli. He first appears in Episode III: Revenge of the Sith aiding Jedi General Yoda on Kashyyyk, to defend the Wookiees from invading Separatists. He attempts to carry out Order 66, but he and another Kashyyyk Scout trooper are beheaded by Yoda. He later appears in the first and second seasons of The Clone Wars television series serving under Luminara. Gree is distinguished by his dyed red hair shaved into two parallel stripes, in remembrance of fallen clones during his first battle, and eyebrows dyed to match his hair. His armor bears green markings, and he appears in green camouflage armor in Revenge of the Sith.

 Special Operations Brigade 
Special Operations Brigade (SOBDE)—a.k.a. GAR Special Forces—was a brigade of elite clone troopers in the Grand Army of the Republic under the command of Jedi General Arligan Zey and Jedi General Iri Camas. Within the film series and in the Star Wars expanded universe media, the brigade contained highly specialized elite Republic special forces soldiers enhanced with genetic experimentation, including Clone Commandos, Advanced Reconnaissance Commandos (ARC Troopers), Alpha-class ARCs, Null-class ARCs, clone assassins, clone shadow troopers, covert operations clone troopers, and special operation clone troopers who usually work alone. All clone commandos and ARCs were trained by Mandalorian mercenaries.

The style and color of a clone trooper's armor often varies depending on their rank, specialization, unit, or environment, for example, the clone troopers on Kashyyyk wear camouflage green scout-style armor whereas the 501st legion wears standard white armor with blue accents. Another example is the aquatic SCUBA troopers, who appear in the animated series Star Wars: Clone Wars. SCUBA troopers are equipped with high-tech breathing apparatuses and long-range blaster rifles.

 Clone Force 99 

Clone Force 99—informally known as "The Bad Batch"—was a clone commando squad consisting of four clone troopers with genetic enhancements not possessed by normal clones—the result of specially designed genetic experimentation. The Bad Batch consisted of CT-9904 "Crosshair," a scout sniper specialist with genetically enhanced eyesight; Wrecker, a demolition and heavy ordnance specialist with enhanced muscular form; Tech, a security specialist with enhanced mental capacity and intelligence; and squad leader Clone Sergeant Hunter, a CQC specialist with enhanced sensory abilities and tracking skills. The squad had maintained an impressive 100% mission completion ratio, but were notorious for their insubordination and were known to get into fights with other troopers.

The squad was introduced in the seventh season of The Clone Wars animated series, where they came to Anaxes to assist Anakin Skywalker, Obi-Wan Kenobi, and Rex on their mission to investigate a source of Separatist' victories, as well as trying to rescue Corporal Echo, the ARC Trooper who was presumed dead on Lola Sayu, now revealed to have been captured by the Techno Union and held on Skako Minor. Following the successful mission, Echo decided to join Clone Force 99 as Hunter's second in command.

In July 2020, it was announced that Clone Force 99 would be receiving their own spin-off series in 2021 on Disney+ titled The Bad Batch that follows their actions in the early days of the Empire. The series premiered on Star Wars Day, May 4, 2021 where it was revealed that the series was set during and immediately after the events of Revenge of the Sith, beginning with the issuance of clone contingency order 66 by Emperor Sheev Palpatine. The activation of Order 66 affected the regular clones, but because of Clone Force 99's extensive genetic modifications, they remained in control of their actions, while the regular clones' inhibitor chips caused them to execute their Jedi commanders unquestioningly. Among them, only Crosshair was affected by the inhibitor chip. Clone Force 99, free from the chip's influence, escaped the Empire from the cloning facilities of Tipoca City, Kamino, leaving behind Crosshair, whose chip had been modified by the Empire to make him even more susceptible to its effects, and picking up Omega, the last of the original series of clones that produced Boba Fett and the only known female clone of Jango Fett.

 05 Commando Battalion 

05 Commando Battalion was one of 10 units of commando groups within the Grand Army of the Republic's Special Operations Brigade. The unit held five companies, with each consisting of 100 commandos per company, which accounted for 25 squads. Within the battalion, Arca Company was housed, who also held Delta Squad and Omega Squad. Veshok Squad was also housed in a separate company. During the Clone Wars, Jedi General Bardan Jusik was placed in charge of the unit, until he stepped down from the Jedi Order and as a military General. When Jusik stepped down, Jedi General Etain Tur-Mukan was placed in charge.

Notable sub-divisions within the 05 Commando Battalion include:
Delta Squad is a unit of four Republic commandos, a type of specialized clone trooper. The squad is introduced in the video game Star Wars: Republic Commando and featured throughout the Republic Commando novels by Karen Traviss, and its troopers make a brief appearance in The Clone Wars television series. Delta is led by Sergeant Boss, RC-1138 and often referred to as simply 38; he is distinguished by orange markings on his armor, and he is voiced by Temuera Morrison. Scorch, RC-1262 and often referred to as simply 62, is the squad's demolitions expert and has a jocular sense of humor; he is distinguished by yellow markings on his armor, and he is voiced by Raphael Sbarge. Sev, RC-1207 and often referred to as simply 07, is the group's sniper and is characterized as grim. During a mission on Kashyyyk at the end of the Clone Wars, depicted at the end of Republic Commando, Sev's transmission signal is lost, and he is declared missing in action; his ultimate fate is uncertain. Sev is distinguished by red markings on his armor, and he is voiced by Jonathan David Cook. Fixer, RC-1140 and often referred to as simply 40, is the hacker and technical expert and is characterized as distant and stern; he is distinguished by green markings on his armor, and he is voiced by Andrew Chaikin. In the television series Bad Batch, Scorch (voiced by Dee Bradley Baker) makes occasional antagonistic appearances working for the Galactic Empire after Order 66.
Omega Squad is a unit of four Republic commandos featured in the "Republic Commando" novels. The members wear black armor, and each man is the sole survivor of his previous unit. Omega is led by Sergeant Niner, RC-1309, who is characterized as serious and protective of the other men. Darman, RC-1136, is a demolitions expert; he falls in love with Jedi Etain Tur-Mukan, and they have a child. Fi, RC-8015, is the squad's sniper and medic, and he is described as seemingly easy-going but troubled by the denial of a normal life. Fi suffers a brain injury in True Colors and is declared legally dead when he falls into a coma; medical procedure requires he be euthanized, but he is taken to Mandalore where he eventually makes a full recovery. Atin, RC-3222, is the squad's technical expert, and he is described as quiet but deeply stubborn. Atin was trained by Walon Vau, unlike the others, and he initially harbors deep resentments for Vau. Corr, CT-5108/8843 later RC-5108/8843, joins the squad upon Fi's injury. Corr is a regular trooper who served as a bomb disposal expert; because of an injury, both arms from the elbows are prosthetic.

 Notable Marshal Commanders 

 Reception 
Graeme McMillan of The Hollywood Reporter felt the decision to make an army of clones is a "softening of the Star Wars own mythology", though the article later corrected that not all troopers in the franchise were clones. Noting that the films never specify that the clone troopers are replaced by regular soldiers by the original trilogy, he believed that the idea of soldiers who are created solely for war and are little more than machines "sanitizes the war of the franchise's title". He praised the decision of The Force Awakens to explicitly move away from clone troopers as bringing "much-needed moral complexity" to the film's conflict. The story arcs and character development of various clone trooper characters in the animated series Star Wars: The Clone Wars, Star Wars: Rebels and Star Wars: The Bad Batch'' was met with praise from both fans and critics alike, with many clones such as Captain Rex becoming fan favorite characters.

See also
Stormtrooper (Star Wars)
501st Legion
Galactic Republic
Galactic Empire
Mandalorians
Spartiate

References

Citations

Sources

External links

 
 

Characters created by George Lucas
Film characters introduced in 2002
Fictional characters with accelerated ageing
Fictional super soldiers
Trooper
Fictional genetically engineered characters
Space marines
Fictional military organizations
Fictional military personnel in films
Fictional sleeper agents
Star Wars Skywalker Saga characters
Star Wars: The Clone Wars characters
Star Wars Rebels characters
Star Wars: The Bad Batch characters
Tales of the Jedi (TV series) characters
Male characters in television
Male film villains